Jason's Lyric (The Original Motion Picture Soundtrack) is the soundtrack to Doug McHenry's 1994 film Jason's Lyric. It was released on September 27, 1994, via Mercury Records. It spawned three singles: "If You Think You're Lonely Now", a cover of the Bobby Womack hit by Jodeci lead singer K-Ci, "Crazy Love" by Brian McKnight, and "U Will Know", a major collaboration from male R&B singers comprising Black Men United (BMU), written by future neo soul artist D'Angelo.

Many artists contributed to this effort, including: Aaron Hall, After 7, Al B. Sure!, Boyz II Men, Brian McKnight, Christopher Williams, D.R.S. Dirty Rotten Scoundrels,  Damion Hall, El DeBarge, Gerald LeVert, H-Town, Ice-T, Joe, Keith Sweat, Lenny Kravitz (guitar), Joe N Little III Lil' Joe from The Rude Boys, Portrait, R. Kelly, Silk, Sovory, Stokley Williams, Tevin Campbell, Tony! Toni! Toné! (Raphael Wiggins and Dwayne Wiggins), Usher and Snoop Dogg

The album peaked at number 17 on the Billboard 200 and topped the Top R&B/Hip-Hop Albums chart.

Track listing

Notes
  signifies a co-producer
  signifies an additional producer
  included Lenny Kravitz, Tevin Campbell, Gerald Levert, El DeBarge, Usher, R. Kelly, Brian McKnight, Boyz II Men, Melvin Edmonds, Keith Sweat, Raphael Saadiq, Christopher Williams, Joe and D'Angelo

Sample credits
Track 2 contains a replayed sample from "Jungle Boogie" by Ronald Bell, George Melvin Brown, Claydes Charles Smith, Robert Spike Mickens, Donald Boyce, Ricky Westfield, Dennis Thomas and Robert Bell
Track 4 contains samples from "God Lives Through" by A Tribe Called Quest

Charts

Weekly charts

Year-end charts

Certifications

See also
List of Billboard number-one R&B albums of 1994

References

External links

1994 soundtrack albums
Hip hop soundtracks
Drama film soundtracks
Albums produced by N.O. Joe
Albums produced by Warren G
Albums produced by Eddie Kramer
Albums produced by Brian McKnight
Albums produced by Quincy Jones III
Albums produced by Narada Michael Walden
Albums produced by Mike Dean (record producer)